Cuthbert Goes Digging is a 1983 video game for the Dragon 32 home computer. Written by Steve Bak at Microdeal, the game features the hero Cuthbert, who also appears in Cuthbert Goes Walkabout and Cuthbert in the Mines. In the game, the player guides Cuthbert through levels of girders, avoiding 'moronians' fatal to the touch. 

The gameplay is basically that of Space Panic: Cuthbert kills moronians by digging holes and causing them to fall down. On later levels, different coloured moronians are harder to kill and must be knocked through two platforms. Cuthbert also battles a time limit on each level, represented by an amount of oxygen remaining. Cuthbert's ability to dig holes can also be used to quickly drop to a lower platform without the use of a ladder.

External links 
 Cuthbert Goes Digging at Tandy Color Computer Games
 Cuthbert Goes Digging at MobyGames

1983 video games
Dragon 32 games
Platform games
TRS-80 Color Computer games
Video game clones
Video games developed in the United Kingdom